The Tejon Hills are a low mountain range in the Transverse Ranges, in southern Kern County, California.

They are completely within property owned by the Tejon Ranch corporation.  A conservation easement is currently managed by the Tejon Ranch Conservancy.

Geography
The Tejon Hills run below the western face of the Tehachapi Mountains, along the edge of the San Joaquin Valley.

Natural history
They are formed of uplifted marine sediment deposits, unlike the adjacent Tehachapi Mountains of igneous materials related to the Sierra Nevada on the north.

The soil has a predominant alkaline ph, and supports several locally endemic plant species.

References 

Mountain ranges of Kern County, California
Tehachapi Mountains
Hills of California
Geography of the San Joaquin Valley
Transverse Ranges
Mountain ranges of Southern California